Queen High is the title of an American pre-Code musical comedy film, produced by Paramount Pictures in 1930. Based upon the 1926 stage musical Queen High that Buddy DeSylva, Lewis Gensler, and Laurence Schwab had adapted from Edward Peple's  1914 farce A Pair of Sixes. The storyline loosely concerns a rivalry between two businessmen that results in a game of poker. Whoever loses the game becomes the winner's servant for a year.

The film stars Charlie Ruggles, Frank Morgan, and Ginger Rogers in one of her earliest film appearances. Making her first film appearance in an uncredited bit part is famed tap dancer Eleanor Powell, whose career in musicals would not take off for another five years. Powell was appearing on Broadway in a show entitled Follow Thru at the time, and a segment of the show was filmed for the movie. Both Rogers and Powell were still in their teens.

Cast
Charles Ruggles as T. Boggs Johns
Frank Morgan as Mr. Nettleton
Ginger Rogers as Polly Rockwell
Stanley Smith as Dick Johns
Helen Carrington as Mrs. Nettleton
Rudolph Cameron as Cyrus Vanderholt
Betty Garde as Florence Cole
Teresa Maxwell-Conover as Mrs. Rockwell
Nina Olivette as Coddles
Tom Brown as Jimmy
Eleanor Powell (as uncredited dancer)

Soundtrack
 "Everything Will Happen for the Best"
Written by Buddy G. DeSylva and Lewis E. Gensler
 "Brother, Just Laugh It Off"
Written by Arthur Schwartz and Ralph Rainger
 "I'm Afraid of You"
Written by Arthur Schwartz and Ralph Rainger
 "It Seems to Me"
Written by Howard Dietz (as Dick Howard) and Ralph Rainger
 "I Love the Girls in My Own Peculiar Way"
Written by E.Y. Harburg and Henry Souvaine

Preservation
Though part of the 700 or so films Paramount sold to Universal, the film is preserved in the Library of Congress with a copy.

References

External links
 

1930 films
1930s English-language films
American black-and-white films
Films directed by Fred C. Newmeyer
1930 musical comedy films
Paramount Pictures films
American musical comedy films
1930s American films